Ünal Karaman (born 29 June 1966, in Konya) is a former Turkish professional footballer and a UEFA Pro Licensed manager.

Club career
He played for Konyaspor (as amateur between 1981–1984), Gaziantepspor (1984–1987), Malatyaspor (1987–1990), Trabzonspor (1990–1999) and Ankaragücü (1999–2002).

International career
Karaman made 36 appearances for the senior Turkey national football team between 1985 and 2002.

Career as manager
He also worked as a caretaker manager for the Turkey national football team in 2004. After serving as the head coach of the Turkey national under-21 football team, he signed up with Konyaspor as a coach in September 2007. Later, Karaman was appointed manager of Ankaragücü after Hakan Kutlu was sacked. He resigned from this position and returned to Konyaspor replacing Giray Bulak, who was recently sacked.

In January 2021, he became manager of Göztepe.

Honours

Club
Trabzonspor
Turkish Cup: 1991–92, 1994–95
Turkish Super Cup: 1995

References

External links
 Ünal Karaman at Mackolik
 

1966 births
Adana Demirspor managers
Association football midfielders
Gaziantepspor footballers
Kardemir Karabükspor managers
Konyaspor managers
Living people
Malatyaspor footballers
MKE Ankaragücü footballers
MKE Ankaragücü managers
Süper Lig managers
Süper Lig players
Şanlıurfaspor managers
Trabzonspor footballers
Trabzonspor managers
TFF First League players
Çaykur Rizespor managers
Turkey international footballers
Turkey national football team managers
Turkish footballers
Turkish football managers